Adsit Cobblestone Farmhouse is a historic home located at Mendon in Monroe County, New York. It is a Federal style cobblestone farmhouse built about 1832. It served as an inn during the mid-19th century and was a popular stopover for farmers delivering grain on the road from Canandaigua to Rochester. It is constructed of medium-sized field cobbles and is one of only 10 surviving cobblestone buildings in Mendon.

It was listed on the National Register of Historic Places in 1996.

References

Houses on the National Register of Historic Places in New York (state)
Cobblestone architecture in New York (state)
Federal architecture in New York (state)
Houses completed in 1832
Houses in Monroe County, New York
National Register of Historic Places in Monroe County, New York